{{DISPLAYTITLE:C23H29N3O2}}
The molecular formula C23H29N3O2 (molar mass: 379.495  g/mol) may refer to:

 Cymserine
 Oxypertine
 1P-LSD

Molecular formulas